Flee is a 2021 adult animated documentary film directed by Jonas Poher Rasmussen. An international co-production with Denmark, France, Norway, and Sweden, it follows the story of a man under the alias Amin Nawabi, who shares his hidden past of fleeing his home country of Afghanistan to Denmark for the first time. Riz Ahmed and Nikolaj Coster-Waldau serve as executive producers and narrators for the English-language dub version.

The film had its world premiere at the 2021 Sundance Film Festival on January 28, 2021, where it won the Grand Jury Prize in the World Cinema Documentary section. It was released in theaters in the United States on December 3, 2021, by Neon and Participant.

While the film received acclaim from film festivals and critics, it incorporates archival film footage of events in Afghanistan from the time Amin fled. The film was frequently ranked one of the best films of 2021, and garnered numerous accolades, mainly for animated and documentary categories including Best Feature Film at the Annecy International Animation Film Festival and Best Animated Feature — Independent at 49th Annie Awards, both making the first animated documentary film to win.

The film was selected as the Danish entry for the Academy Award for Best International Feature Film, where it received one of the five finalists and became the second foreign-language animated film after Waltz with Bashir (2008), along with nominations in the Best Documentary Feature and Best Animated Feature categories, becoming the first film ever to be nominated in all three of those categories at the same ceremony.

Plot
"The film is presented in the form of an animated documentary; animated scenes depict Amin's past and present, interspersed with archival footage."

Amin Nawabi is being interviewed in Denmark by director Jonas Poher Rasmussen, who has known Amin since they were teenagers. Jonas is making a documentary about Amin's life, including his escape from Afghanistan to Denmark as a refugee. Amin has not shared the full details of his story with anyone, including his boyfriend Kasper, whom he plans to marry. The trauma of his past affects Amin's ability to settle down, and he considers a position away from Kasper in the United States as a postdoctoral researcher at Princeton University.

Amin begins by sharing stories of his childhood in Kabul with his mother Tahera, sisters Fahima and Sabia, and his older brother Saif. Amin's father is not in their life, having been imprisoned as a perceived threat following the outbreak of the Soviet-Afghan War. Saif is forced to flee from police regularly to avoid being drafted to fight. After the Soviet Union withdraws from Afghanistan, the family flees Kabul due to the impending invasion by mujahideen forces. They fly to Russia, where they meet Amin's oldest brother Abbas, who is currently living in Sweden having fled Afghanistan years earlier. Abbas arranges for human traffickers to smuggle the family to Sweden. While waiting to leave Russia, they are forced to stay indoors, as they are staying in the country illegally. Amin's sisters are the first to be smuggled, being placed on a freight container on a cargo ship with dozens of other refugees. The two survive but are traumatized due to the difficulty of the journey.

In the present, Jonas expresses surprise that Amin's siblings are still alive and living in Sweden, having previously thought Amin had no living family. Amin reveals that he keeps the truth hidden for fear he will be sent back to Afghanistan if it is revealed that he did not come to Denmark as an orphaned refugee as he claimed. Amin and Kasper tour a prospective house for them to live in after they are married; Kasper expresses concern about Amin's ability to stay in one place for an extended period. In the past, Amin, Saif, and Tahera flee Russia by truck with a group of fellow refugees. The group boards a boat that will bring them to Sweden across the Baltic Sea. The boat encounters bad weather during the trip, causing the engine to die. After several days adrift, they are discovered by a Norwegian cruise ship. Amin and his family are held captive in Estonia for six months before being deported back to Russia.

In the present, Amin decides to accept the position at Princeton, causing an argument between him and Kasper; he leaves and stays at Jonas's home. In the past, Tahera falls sick after their return to Russia. Saif takes responsibility for the family, deciding to send Amin out of Russia first using more expensive but more reliable smugglers, who tell him he must say he is an orphan to avoid being deported back to Afghanistan. Amin makes it to Ukraine, but is sent on a flight to Copenhagen rather than Sweden. Once there, he turns himself over to the authorities as a refugee and makes contact with Abbas, who instructs him to continue to lie about his family members being killed. Several years later, Amin visits Abbas and his sisters in Stockholm. After admitting to them that he is gay, Abbas takes him to a gay club, telling him that the family always knew about his sexuality.

In the present, Jonas visits Amin in New York City, where he expresses a desire to settle down, having constantly been on guard throughout his life. He returns to Denmark, where he reunites with Kasper. Four months later, the two are married and have purchased a house together. 

An epilogue reveals that Amin's brother and mother eventually escaped Russia and that the fate of their father still remains unknown.

Voice cast 
 Amin Nawabi as himself (present day)
 Daniel Karimyar as Amin (9-11)
 Fardin Mijdzadeh as Amin (15-18)
 Jonas Poher Rasmussen as himself
 Kasper (Amin's boyfriend) as himself
 Belal Faiz as Saif (13-19)
 Milad Eskandari as Saif (8)
 Zahra Mehrwarz as Fahima (28)
 Elaha Faiz as Fahima (13-26)
 Sadia Faiz as Sabia (16-26)

A number of the voice cast members are credited as anonymous, including the voice of Amin at ages 13–15, Abbas, Akthar Nawabi, Tahera, and young Tahera.

Production
In January 2021, it was announced Riz Ahmed and Nikolaj Coster-Waldau would serve as executive producers on the film, and narrate an English-language dub version of the film.

Animation 
The core animation team behind the film consisted of around ten animators and cleanup artists in Denmark, as well as a team of coloring artists in France. Each scene would go through a rough pass of animation where the team checked the acting of the characters and the intention. Once Poher Rasmussen approved it, the animators would tighten up the drawings in terms of the look of characters. The cleanup team would then check for the correct brushwork — meant to seem inky and sketchy as if from a graphic novel to give maturity to the line work — before finally shipping it off to the coloring team to embellish the characters. “It was a pretty big machinery,” noted Ladekjær.

Release
Flee had its world premiere at the Sundance Film Festival on January 28, 2021. Shortly after, Neon/Participant, Curzon Artificial Eye and Haut et Court acquired US, British and French distribution rights respectively. The film was initially set to have its world premiere at the Cannes Film Festival in May 2020, but the festival was cancelled due to the COVID-19 pandemic. It was also screened at the 2021 Toronto International Film Festival and the 2021 New York Film Festival in September 2021.

The film was released in select theaters for New York and Los Angeles by NEON and Participant on December 3, 2021 with a nationwide expansion on January 21, 2022. The film became available on Hulu on February 8, 2022.

Reception

Box office
In its opening weekend, the film earned $24,794 from four theaters for a per screen average of $6,198.

Critical response
Flee received widespread critical acclaim, with Sundance juror Kim Longinotto calling it "an instant classic" at the festival's awards ceremony. The critics consensus reads "Depicting the refugee experience through vivid animation, Flee pushes the boundaries of documentary filmmaking to present a moving memoir of self-discovery." On Metacritic, the film has a score of 91 out of 100 based on reviews from 33 critics, indicating "universal acclaim". It is also the sixth best reviewed film of 2021 in the website, as well the best reviewed animated film of that year.

Metacritic reported that Flee appeared on over 33 film critics' top-ten lists for 2021, one of only two animated films to appear on the list for the year, alongside The Mitchells vs. the Machines. The film ranked first and second on two lists.

Parasite director Bong Joon-ho listed Flee as one of his favorite films of 2021, and wrote a letter, calling it "The most moving piece of cinema I saw this year."

UK Film Review gave a 5-star rating. BBC listed as one of the twenty best films of 2021. Flee also ranked as the seventh best film of 2021 in an IndieWire poll to 187 critics and journalists.

Accolades
At Sundance, Flee won the Grand Jury Prize in the World Cinema Documentary section. The film was subsequently screened at the Annecy International Animation Film Festival, where it won Best Feature Film. Flee also won The Cinema for Peace Award for The Most Valuable Documentary of the Year in 2022. 

At the 2021 Toronto International Film Festival, the film was second runner-up for the People's Choice Award for Documentaries. It is also nominated for two Critics' Choice Documentary Awards, for Best Feature and Best Director.

The film won NBR Freedom of Expession and one of the top documentaries at National Board of Review, a nomination for Golden Globe Award for Best Animated Feature, earned two categories for British Academy Film Awards, won an Annie Award for the Best Animated Feature — Independent and four Dorian Awards.

See also
 Persepolis, a 2007 animated biographical drama film
 Waltz with Bashir, a 2008 Israeli animated documentary
 List of submissions to the 94th Academy Awards for Best International Feature Film
 List of Danish submissions for the Academy Award for Best International Feature Film

References

External links
  with trailer
 
 
 

2021 films
2021 animated films
2021 documentary films
2021 LGBT-related films
American animated films
American documentary films
American LGBT-related films
Annie Award winners
Animated documentary films
Biographical documentary films
British animated films
British documentary films
British LGBT-related films
Danish animated films
Danish documentary films
Danish LGBT-related films
2020s Danish-language films
Documentaries about war
Documentary films about gay men
Documentary films about refugees
French animated films
French documentary films
French LGBT-related films
Neon (distributor) films
Norwegian animated films
Norwegian documentary films
Norwegian LGBT-related films
Participant (company) films
Swedish animated films
Swedish documentary films
Swedish LGBT-related films
Sundance Film Festival award winners
LGBT-related animated films
Films postponed due to the COVID-19 pandemic
Annecy Cristal for a Feature Film winners
Documentary films about LGBT and Islam
2020s English-language films
2021 multilingual films
2020s American films
2020s British films
2020s French films
Films about immigration